Empire is the debut studio album by Belgian singer and songwriter Blanche. It was released on 29 May 2020 by PIAS Belgium. The album includes the singles "Empire", "Fences", "1, 2, Miss You" and "Soon"

Background
Talking about the album, Blanche said on her official website, "Empire is an album to be digested from start to finish, whereby every song has been placed with intention. Empire is rich in arrangements, nuanced in its rhythms and dripped in diversified themes. This is my album; these are my songs and my feelings. Some songs are more personal, others are like modern tales."

Singles
"Empire" was released as the lead single from the album on 13 February 2020. "Fences" was released as the second single from the album on 27 March 2020. "1, 2, Miss You" was released as the third single from the album on 8 May 2020. "Till We Collide" was released as the fourth single on 26 June 2020. "Summer Nights" was released as the album's fifth single on 28 August 2020.

"Soon", released as a single on 20 July 2018, was also included on the album.

Track listing

Charts

Release history

References

2020 albums